Koswatta Ralalage Udayakantha Gunathilaka (born 3 May 1965) is a Sri Lankan politician, former provincial councillor and Member of Parliament.

Gunathilaka was born on 3 May 1965. He was a member of Warakapola Divisional Council and the Sabaragamuwa Provincial Council. He contested the 2020 parliamentary election as a Sri Lanka People's Freedom Alliance electoral alliance candidate in Kegalle District and was elected to the Parliament of Sri Lanka.

References

1965 births
Local authority councillors of Sri Lanka
Living people
Members of the 16th Parliament of Sri Lanka
Members of the Sabaragamuwa Provincial Council
People's Alliance (Sri Lanka) politicians
Sinhalese politicians
Sri Lankan Buddhists
Sri Lanka People's Freedom Alliance politicians
Sri Lanka Podujana Peramuna politicians
United People's Freedom Alliance politicians